Tetragonoderus aericollis is a species of beetle in the family Carabidae. It was described by Quedenfeldt in 1883.

References

aericollis
Beetles described in 1883